Iván Díaz may refer to:

Iván Díaz (footballer born 1978)
Iván Díaz (footballer born 1993)